Arctiocossus antargyreus is a moth in the family Cossidae. It is found in Namibia and South Africa.

References

Natural History Museum Lepidoptera generic names catalog

Cossinae
Moths described in 1874
Moths of Africa